Addateegala Mandal is one of the 22 mandals in Alluri Sitharama Raju of Andhra Pradesh. As per census 2011, there are 90 villages.

Demographics 
Addateegala Mandal has total population of 37,241 as per the Census 2011 out of which 18,686 are males while 18,555 are females and the Average Sex Ratio of Addateegala Mandal is 993. The total literacy rate of Addateegala Mandal is 57.86%. The male literacy rate is 56.05% and the female literacy rate is 47.25%.

Towns & Villages

Villages 

Addateegala
Anigeru
Anukulapalem
Atchiyyapeta	
Badadam
Bandakonda
Bandamamillu
Bhimavaram
Bhimudupakalu
Bodlanka
Chakirevula
Chaparatipalem
Chikkapugedda
Chinamunakanagedda
Chinavadisakarra
Chinna
Chinnampadu
Chodavaram
D. Ammapeta
D. Kothuru
D. Krishnavaram
D. Pinjarikonda
D. Ramavaram
Dabbapalem
Dakodu
Darsinuthula @ Regulapadu
Dhanayampalem
Doddivaka
Dokkapalem
Doramamidi
Ducherthi
Duppalapalem
Gadichinnampalem
Gavarayyapeta
Gondolu
Gontuvanipalem
Jajipalem
Jalluru
Kalimamidi
Kimmuru
Kinaparti
Konalova
Kothurupadu
Kothurupadu
Kottampalem
Kottampalem
Kovelapalem
Languparti
Latchireddipalem
Makaram
Mallavaram Mamillu
Mamidipalem
Matlapadu
Mitlapalem
Mulakayala Bhimavaram
Nimmalapalem
Nukarai
Paidiputtapadu
Panasaloddi
Panukuratipalem	
Papampeta
Pedamunakanagedda
Peddavadisakarra
Penikelapadu
Puligogulapadu
Rajanagaram
Ravigudem
Ravulapalem
Rayapalle
Rollagedda
Sarampeta
Sarampetapadu
Seetharam
Settipalle
Somannapalem
Thimmapuram
Thungamadugula
Tirumalawada
Tiyyamamidi
Uligogula
Uppalapadu
Vangalamadugu
Vedullakonda
Veerabhadrapuram
Veeravaram
Venkatanagaram
Vetamamidi
Vutlapalem
Yellapuram
Yellavaram

See also 
List of mandals in Andhra Pradesh

References 

Mandals in Alluri Sitharama Raju district